The Iveco EuroCargo is a range of medium-duty trucks produced by the Italian manufacturer Iveco since 1991. The EuroCargo replaced the Zeta model produced in the 1970s.

First generation (1991-2002) 

The first generation was designed by IVECO Design Centre (Neu Ulm) leaded by Leonhard Schmude with help from Giorgetto Giugiaro of Italdesign. The maximum gross weight was 6-15 tons, and for models produced in Langley (in Great Britain) up to 17 tons. Both 4x2 and 4x4 (10 and 14 tons) were available. 

There were three Iveco engines available, in different power ranges: 

 8040 series, 4 cylinders, bore and stroke 104x115mm, 3908 cm³, 
 8060 series, 6 cylinders, bore and stroke 104x1x115mm, 5861 cm³, 
 8360 series, 6 cylinders, bore and stroke 112x130mm, 7685 cm³, 

In addition, 4 types of cabs were available: standard (length ), extended bed, extended bed and double cab. The 6-10 ton versions were equipped with disc brakes on all wheels, hydraulically assisted. The heavier models had rear drum brakes. They used four types of suspension: parabolic leaf springs, semi-elliptical leaf springs, parabolic springs in the front and rear airbags (in the lighter models), air suspension (for urban distribution). In October 1997 there were updates, focusing on the cab and the braking system. At the same time, production in Langley ended, closing the plant. Production was now concentrated in Brescia.

Second generation (2002-2015) 

The second generation of the series, introduced in 2002, was designed by Bertone. It was produced in Brescia in Italy, Sete Lagoas in Brazil (from January 2005 onwards) and in a Ferreyra in Argentina, and also assembled in Venezuela. 

The maximum gross weight ranged from 6 to 18 tons. Both of 4x2 and 4x4 (GVW 10 and 14 tons) were available. The Iveco Tector engines were used in many variants, including: R4, 3920 cm³, ; R6, 5880 cm³, . 

There were 4 types of cabs available: Standard Time (MLC), extended bed (MLL, with one or two bunk beds), augmented bed and Extended Crew (MLD, for 7.5t to 15t models) for the driver and six passengers. All 6-10 ton GVW versions are equipped with disc brakes on all wheels, hydraulically assisted. The heavier models have rear drum brakes. The suspensions are the same as those available on the first series. In 2004 and in 2006 there were updates, especially to the Tector 4 and 6 engine range with the adaptation to the requirements of the Euro 4 and Euro 5 emission standards (with SCR). Euromidi bus chassis based on the Eurocargo were produced at the Barcelona plant.

 
In mid-2008, the Eurocargo was facelifted. The main changes are visible in the design and styling of the cabin. Iveco replaced all its own transmission models with new versions from the German manufacturer ZF with a similar number of ratios (5, 6, 9). The 6-speed versions of the ZF gearbox are also available with Eurotronic automatic or manual (sequential) gearboxes. To advertise the update special All Blacks versions were made. They are characterized by black paint and other details in this color. All engines are Euro 5 compliant with SCR. The truck finished second in the competition for the title of International Truck of the Year 2009.

Third generation (2015-present) 

A new version of the Eurocargo was presented on 15 September 2015. The vehicle is produced at the Brescia plant. The shape of the new air intakes and the new grille have what has been described as a "smile" shape. The main innovations of this model concern the internal and external design: there is a dashboard equipped with new controls that can be used while driving, an airbag integrated in the steering wheel, standard electronic devices for driving assistance such as LDWS, EVSC, AEBS, ACC, LED Daytime Running Lights (DRL) lights. The 2015 model adopts the HI-SCR system, a "flap" on the exhaust that retains hot gases to quickly bring the system up to temperature, and EcoSwitch and EcoRoll systems.

The vehicle is also available in the Natural Power LNG version.

The engines are combined with manual (6 and 9-speed), semi-automatic (6 and 12-speed) and automatic gearboxes with torque converter. The air suspension is managed by an ECAS system and the braking system is hydropneumatic on the 6-10 t range and fully pneumatic on the 11-19 t range. This generation won the award International Truck of the Year 2016.

References

External Link
Official website

EuroCargo
Vehicles introduced in 1991